This is a list of presidents of Somalia. Since the establishment of the office of president in 1960, there have been 9 official presidents. The president is the head of state of Somalia and the commander-in-chief of the Somali Armed Forces. The current office holder is Hassan Sheikh Mohamud, having been elected in the 2022 presidential election. He is the first person to have held the office on several occasions, having been previously elected in the 2012 presidential election and held the office from 2012–2017.

List

Timeline

See also 
Somalia
Politics of Somalia
List of colonial governors of British Somaliland
List of colonial governors of Italian Somaliland
President of Somalia
List of prime ministers of Somalia
Speaker of Somali Parliament
Lists of office-holders
List of current heads of state and government

Notes

References

External links
World Statesmen – Somalia

Somalia

Presidents
1960 establishments in Somalia
Politics of Somalia